Walter Krüger (11 April 1930 - 28 October 2018) was an East German athlete who competed mainly in the javelin throw. He was born in Altenpleen, Pomerania. He competed for the United Team of Germany in the 1960 Summer Olympics held in Rome, Italy in the javelin throw where he won the silver medal.

References

1930 births
German male javelin throwers
Olympic silver medalists for the United Team of Germany
Athletes (track and field) at the 1960 Summer Olympics
Olympic athletes of the United Team of Germany
2018 deaths
Medalists at the 1960 Summer Olympics
Olympic silver medalists in athletics (track and field)